Plaintiff M61/2010E v Commonwealth of Australia; Plaintiff M69 of 2010 v Commonwealth of Australia is a decision of the High Court of Australia in its "original jurisdiction" under Section 75 of the Constitution of Australia. The plaintiffs were Sri Lankan citizens that had arrived at Christmas Island in 2010. They sought a declaration that they were not given the same procedural fairness as on-shore claimants. The court en banc ruled for the plaintiffs.

References

High Court of Australia cases
2010 in Australian law
2010 in case law
Australian migration law